Dentiraja is a genus of skates native to the oceans around Australia. Members of this genus usually grow up to a maximum of 35 – 70 cm, with the longest being Heald's skate (Dentiraja healdi), with a maximum length of about 72 cm.

Species
There are currently 9 recognized species in this genus:

 Dentiraja australis, (Macleay, 1884) (Sydney skate)
 Dentiraja cerva (Whitley, 1939) (white-spotted skate)
 Dentiraja confusa (Last, 2008) (Australian longnose skate)
 Dentiraja endeavouri (Last, 2008) (Endeavour skate)
 Dentiraja falloarga (Last, 2008) (false argus skate)
 Dentiraja flindersi Last & Gledhill, 2008 (pygmy thornback skate)
 Dentiraja healdi (Last, W. T. White & Pogonoski, 2008) (Heald's skate)
 Dentiraja lemprieri (Richardson, 1845) (Thornback skate)
 Dentiraja polyommata (Ogilby, 1910) (argus skate)

References

Ray genera
 
Taxa named by Gilbert Percy Whitley
Rajidae